The 2016 Massachusetts Republican presidential primary was held on Tuesday March 1, as one of the Republican Party's 2016 presidential primaries. Massachusetts was one of eleven states that held both their Democratic and Republican presidential primaries on that day, dubbed "Super Tuesday". 42 delegates were allocated proportionally to all candidates who received at least 5 percent of the vote in the primary.

State of the Campaign 
Donald Trump won the Massachusetts primary comfortably, in keeping with polls that had shown him with double-digit leads over his primary rivals in the state. Trump's victory also reflected his relative strength among Republicans in the Northeastern United States. Trump received about 49% of the vote statewide. John Kasich and Marco Rubio came in second and third, respectively, each with about 18% of the vote. Ted Cruz came in fourth with just under 10% of the vote. Of the state's 42 delegates, Trump received 22 of them, Kasich and Rubio each received eight, and Cruz received four.

Donald Trump enjoyed the endorsement of former Senator Scott Brown, who stumped for him in Massachusetts and New Hampshire ahead of the primary.

Endorsements

Polling

Aggregate polls

Analysis 
Massachusetts was Trump's best Super Tuesday state. According to exit polls by Edison Research, Trump's base were white non-college voters, whom he swept with 63% of the vote in a five-way contest.

According to Pew Research, Massachusetts has the lowest percentage of Evangelicals of any Super Tuesday contest, but the highest percentage of Catholics. 

Aside from a few Kasich-voting towns in the Boston Metro, Trump swept every town in the state.

References

Massachusetts
2016 Massachusetts elections
Massachusetts Republican primaries